Cambusdoon was a cricket ground in Ayr, Scotland.  The ground was used by Ayr Cricket Club until the club moved from the ground in 1997 to the purpose built Cambusdoon New Ground.

The first recorded match held on the ground was in 1931 when Ayr Cricket Club played against Kelburne Cricket Club.
First first-class match played the grounds when Scotland played against Ireland in 1958.

A further first-class match was played there when Scotland played Ireland in 1974.  The ground held its final recorded match in 1990 when Scotland Under-23s played Ireland Under-23s.

References

External links
Cambusdoon, Ayr at ESPNcricinfo
Cambusdoon, Ayr at CricketArchive

Cricket grounds in Scotland
Defunct cricket grounds in Scotland
Sports venues in Ayr